Bala Nagamma may refer to:

 Bala Nagamma (1942 film), a Telugu-language film directed by Chittajallu Pullayya
 Bala Nagamma (1959 film), a Telugu-language film directed by Vedantam Raghavaiah
 Bala Nagamma (1966 film), a Kannada-language film directed by P. R. Kaundinya
 Bala Nagamma (1981 film), a Tamil-language film directed by K. Shankar